In mathematics, and in particular the study of game theory, a function is graph continuous if it exhibits the following properties.  The concept was originally defined by Partha Dasgupta and Eric Maskin in 1986 and is a version of continuity that finds application in the study of continuous games.

Notation and preliminaries

Let  be the payoff function for agent .

Definition

Dasgupta and Maskin named this property "graph continuity" because, if one plots a graph of a player's payoff as a function of his own strategy (keeping the other players' strategies fixed), then a graph-continuous payoff function will result in this graph changing continuously as one varies the strategies of the other players.

The property is interesting in view of the following theorem.

References

 Partha Dasgupta and Eric Maskin 1986. "The existence of equilibrium in discontinuous economic games, I: theory".  The Review of Economic Studies, 53(1):1–26

Game theory
Theory of continuous functions